The works of J. M. Barrie about Peter Pan feature many characters. The numerous adaptations and sequels to those stories feature many of the same characters, and introduce new ones. Most of these strive for continuity with Barrie's work, developing a fairly consistent cast of characters living in Neverland and the real-world settings of Barrie's stories.

Major publications and films

This article covers the characters appearing in the canonical works of Barrie, the official books and plays, the major motion pictures and television series based on them, and the major prequels/sequels (authorised and not):

Characters in Barrie's works 

A number of characters appear throughout J. M. Barrie's works, including the play Peter Pan, the novel Peter and Wendy, and the novel Peter Pan in Kensington Gardens.

Major characters
Peter Pan is a free spirited and adventurous young boy who would not grow up. He can fly, and lives on the island called Neverland. He is described as "a lovely boy, clad in skeleton leaves and the juices that ooze out of trees". It is also stated that he still has all his baby teeth.
Tinker Bell is a tinker fairy and Peter Pan's companion at the time of his adventures with Wendy Darling and her brothers. She is known for her loyalty to Peter but is very jealous of Wendy and Tiger Lily. In the original play, she is portrayed by a darting light and voiced by a tinkling bell.
Wendy Moira Angela Darling is a young girl, the eldest child of the Darling family, who is befriended by Peter Pan and flies away to Neverland to be a mother to him and the Lost Boys and share their adventures.
Captain Hook is a pirate and captain of the Jolly Roger. He is Peter Pan's archenemy and is determined to get revenge on Peter for cutting off his right hand in a battle and feeding it to a crocodile.
Mr. Smee is the Irish bo'sun, the only non-conformist in Hook's crew. One of two pirates to survive the final battle and "henceforth wandered around the world in his spectacles, making a precarious living by saying he was the only man that Jas. Hook had feared."
John Napoleon Darling is the middle child, named after Jack Llewelyn Davies.
Michael Nicholas Darling is the youngest of the three children. In an early draft of the play, the character's name was "Alexander" or "Alex", but was renamed after Michael Llewelyn Davies and Nicholas Llewelyn Davies, who were both born during the play's development.

Minor characters

The Darling family
George Darling: the father of Wendy, Michael and John. He is a bank clerk and is named after George Llewelyn Davies.
Mary Darling: the mother of Wendy, John and Michael and wife of George Darling. She is named after Mary Ansell, Barrie's wife.
Nana: the Newfoundland acting as the Darling children's nanny. She was based on Barrie's own Newfoundland, Luath.
Jane: (surname is not given) the daughter of the adult Wendy Darling who appears briefly in Barrie's An Afterthought and the final chapter of Peter and Wendy.
Margaret: Jane's daughter, mentioned at the end of the story as the one who will go back to Neverland with Peter for spring cleaning.

The Pirates
Gentleman Starkey: once an usher in a public school "and still dainty in his ways of killing". He and Smee are the sole survivors of the final battle, although he got captured by the Piccaninnies, "who made him nurse for all their papooses". 
Bill Jukes: used to be on the Walrus under Captain Flint, and is heavily tattooed. 
Cecco: a very handsome Italian fellow who was said to have his name in letters of blood on the back of the governor of the prison at Gao".
Cookson: he is said to be the brother of real-life pirate Black Murphy, but this was never proved.
Noodler: not much is known about him, except for the fact that his hands are fixed on backwards, and he is superstitious, like all sailors.
Skylights (Morgan's Skylights): he is killed off early on the novel "to show Hook's method".
Black Pirate: it is only stated that he is gigantic and has had many names that still terrify children on the banks of the Guadjo-mo.
Alf Mason: one of the pirates killed in mortal combat with Lean Wolf early on in the battle between the pirates and Tiger Lily's braves.
Robert Mullins: he is killed by Peter in the final battle with the pirates.
George Scourie: another casualty in the battle.
Chas. Turley ("Chay Turley" in the play): he is said "to laugh with the wrong side of his mouth (having no other)"; another casualty in battle by the Piccaninnies.
Foggerty: an Alsatian who also died in the above battle.
Whibbles: he wears an eye patch and is the first casualty in the final battle.
 Ed Teynte: the quartermaster in the novel (but not mentioned in the play), was the first killed in the last battle (instead of Whibbles). 
Black Gilmour (only in play): killed in battle by the Piccaninnies.
Alan Herb (only in play): "still remembered at Manaos for playing skittles with the mate of Switch for each other's heads"; killed in battle by the Piccaninnies.
Canary Robb (only in play): killed in the above battle.

Other characters
Lost Boys: a gang of young boys who fell out of their prams and were not claimed by their parents, so Peter brought them to the Neverland. It is implied there has been a succession of lost boys over time, but the boys in Barrie's work are Tootles, Nibs, Curly, Slightly, and The Twins. Additional or different Lost Boys appear in sequels, prequels and adaptations.
Great Big Little Panther: the Chief of the Piccaninny tribe and the father of Tiger Lily.

Tiger Lily: the chief's daughter, often described as a princess (in her own right), who is captured by the Pirates and left to drown on Marooners' Rock before being rescued by Peter Pan.
Crocodile (Tick-Tock in Disney's movie): Hook's other nemesis and the only thing which he fears. It ate Hook's hand when Peter cut it off in battle and craves for the rest of him. The clock swallowed by the crocodile warns Hook of its proximity. In Peter and Wendy, the crocodile is briefly referred to by the feminine pronoun "she", a point overlooked in subsequent adaptations.
Mermaids are half woman and half fish; they live in the sea but are often seen in the Mermaids' Lagoon in Neverland. They're vain, unfriendly and care for their looks and good appearance. They can be dangerous creatures (especially at night) who dislike all humans (except Peter Pan) and act very spitefully towards Wendy.
 Liza: the maid in the Darling household.
Maimie Mannering : a little girl who is helped and befriended by Peter Pan in Peter Pan in Kensington Gardens, and considered to be Wendy's literary predecessor. Although enjoying Kensington Gardens and her friendship with Peter when she stays behind one day after Lock Out time, she comes to realise that her mother is very worried about her so she must return. When she grows up, she continues to think of Peter, dedicating presents and letters to him. To remember Maimie, Peter rides the imaginary goat she created for him.

Characters from Disney's Peter Pan-Tinker Bell franchise

Return to Never Land

Jane: Wendy's daughter. She is portrayed in as a cynical, no-nonsense, down-to-earth girl who tries to act very grown up. She refuses to believe her mother's stories about Peter Pan. Unlike Wendy, she is not interested in playing "mother" for the Lost Boys and spends most of her time in Neverland just wanting to leave.
Danny: Danny is Jane's little brother. He believes entirely in his mother's stories about Peter Pan and is very similar to his uncle Michael (from the original Disney film adaptation), even to wearing footed-pajamas.
Edward: Edward is Wendy's husband and the father of Jane and Danny. He is called to serve in the British army during World War II, and returns at the end of the film. He is depicted as a warm and caring man.
Nana II: a St. Bernard owned by Jane's family who could be a descendant of the original Nana.
The Octopus: a gigantic orange octopus who replaces the Crocodile for some unknown reason as Captain Hook's enemy who wants to eat him because he enjoys his taste. He makes "plip-plop" noises with his eyes and suckers reminiscent of the Crocodile's ticking. In the end, he sinks Hook's ship and chases Hook and his crew (who he mistakes for fish) into the distance.

Disney Fairies

Queen Clarion (Anjelica Huston) is the Fairy Queen of Pixie Hollow. She is slender and taller than hand-size with a light shimmering long yellow dress, a light golden shimmering large yellow butterfly shaped wings, tiaras for different occasions, fair skin, blue eyes, and light brown hair in an up-do style.
Bobble and Clank (Rob Paulsen and Jeff Bennett, respectively) are a pair of intelligent yet bumbling tinker sparrow men who form a brotherly relationship with Tinker Bell.
Chloe (Brenda Song), a garden fairy of Thai descent. She is small, slender, and hand-sized with brown hair, brown eyes, fair skin, and pointy ears. She wears a pink sports dress and leggings.
Fawn (America Ferrera, Angela Bartys and Ginnifer Goodwin) an animal-talent fairy. She is small, slender, and hand-sized with an orange and brown dress, amber curl shoes, fair skin, light freckles, braided light brown hair, amber eyes, pointy ears, and clear fairy wings on her back.
Iridessa (Raven-Symoné) is a light-talent fairy. She is small, slender, and hand-sized with a sunflower petal dress, yellow shoes, dark skin, black hair in a round up-do, brown eyes, pointy ears, and clear fairy wings on her back.
Nyx (Rosario Dawson) an incredibly loyal and devoted scouting-talent anti-hero in Tinker Bell and the Legend of the NeverBeast. She wears brown sleeveless shirts and leggings, with gray-and-black striped undershirts and boots, olive green waist sashes, and black wrist bracers. She protects all of Pixie Hollow from any dangers or threats, also leads a team of fellow scout fairies who follow her commands without question. She is known to be quite tough and the kind of person who will fight until the fighting is done. She never backs down and will do whatever it takes to ensure the safety and wellbeing of Pixie Hollow and its people.
Periwinkle (Lucy Hale) is a frost-talent fairy. She is Tinker Bell's fraternal twin sister born of the same baby's first laugh and match. She is small, slender, and hand-sized with fair skin, ice-blue eyes, snow white hair, pink blushing cheeks, and pointy ears and wears an aqua strapless dress that shimmers like ice and aqua blue-colored shoes with white puffs on her toes and has clear sparkly fairy wings on her back, which are identical to Tinker Bell's.
Rosetta (Kristin Chenoweth and Megan Hilty) is a garden-talent fairy. She is small, slender, and hand-sized with a rose petal dress in three shades of pink, fair skin, red shoes, shoulder-length red hair with curled ends, green eyes, pointy ears, and clear fairy wings on her back.
Silvermist (Lucy Liu) is a water-talent fairy. She is small, slender, and hand-sized with a dark blue-green lily single-strapped dress, blue shoes, fair skin, long loose black hair, brown eyes, pointy ears, and clear fairy wings on her back.
Terence (Jesse McCartney) is a pixie dust "sparrow man" of French-Celtic descent. He also her best friend. He is small, slender, and hand-sized with blonde hair, blue eyes, fair skin, and pointy ears and wears an acorn top hat.
Vidia (Pamela Adlon) is a fast-flying-talent fairy. She has black ponytailed hair, gray eyes, pointy ears, fair skin and wears a purple vest with pink feathers, purple pants and ballet shoes and has clear wings on her back.
Zarina (Christina Hendricks) an alchemist who dabbles in piracy with Hook for a while, she appears in the movie The Pirate Fairy.

Gwendolyn Carlisle
Gwendolyn Jane Mary Darling Carlisle is a human girl whom Peter Pan brings to Never Land, and a descendant of Wendy Darling. She lives with her parents and grandmother in the same house that Wendy had lived in so long ago. She appears in the book "Fairies and the Quest for Never Land".

Jake and the Never Land Pirates

Characters from other works

Steven Spielberg's Hook

The Banning family
Peter Banning is Peter Pan, grown up. When he fell in love with Moira, he abandoned his eternal youth. He was adopted by an American couple named Hank and Jane Banning, and forgot about his life as Peter Pan. He is played by Robin Williams.
Moira Banning – Moira is Wendy Darling's granddaughter and Peter Banning's wife. She is played by Caroline Goodall.
Jack Banning – Jack is Peter and Moira Banning's son and Maggie's older brother. Nearing his teen years, Jack is often frustrated by his father's repeated broken promises and absences that he turns towards Hook for a father figure. However, after watching Rufio die, he turns his back on Hook and regains his trust in Peter. Jack is played by Charlie Korsmo.
Maggie Banning – Maggie is Peter and Moira Banning's daughter and Jack's younger sister. Sweet and imaginative, she is captivated by stories of Peter Pan. Maggie is the only one who retains faith in Peter and mistrusts Hook. When she learns that her father is the famous Peter Pan, Maggie accepts him and tells Hook off, saying that he's the one who needs a mother to straighten up his bad attitude. She is played by Amber Scott.

Lost Boys
Rufio is the leader of the Lost Boys and Peter's successor who was hand-chosen by him when he chose to leave Neverland for good. He is the anti-hero for the film's first two acts, initially refusing to believe that Peter Banning is Pan grown up. After Peter regains the power of flight, the two reconcile their differences when Rufio acknowledges Peter's identity as the true Pan. Rufio fights beside him in the final battle against Hook's pirates but is slain by Hook. He dies in Peter's arms after admitting that his one wish was to have a father like Peter. He was played by Dante Basco.
Thud Butt is a member of the Lost Boys who accepts the possibility that Peter Banning may be Peter Pan from the start, and strikes up a friendship with him. At the end of the film, with Rufio having been slain by Hook, Peter chooses Thud Butt as the Lost Boys' new leader. He is played by Raushan Hammond.
The remaining Lost Boys consist of: 
Ace (Jasen Fisher)
Don't Ask (James Madio)
No Nap (Ahmad Stoner)
Pockets (Isaiah Robinson)
Latchboy (Alex Zuckerman)
Too Small (Thomas Tulak)
twins Sooner (Brian Willis) and Later (Brett Willis)

Peter Pan (2003) 

 Aunt Millicent: the Darling children's maternal aunt, a stuffy character who wants Wendy to leave her childhood world and grow up. She softens at the end of the film, and adopts Slightly.

Peter and the Starcatchers

Aster family 
Leonard and Louise Aster: Molly Aster's parents. Leonard is an ambassador for the King to Rudoon. In Peter and the Shadow Thieves, Louise is taken captive by the Others.

Molly Aster is one of the main characters of the four Starcatchers novels. She is the daughter of famous Starcatcher Leonard Aster and his wife, Louise Aster, and is therefore a Starcatcher by blood and very wealthy. Her relationships with Peter, George Darling, Tinker Bell, and the mermaids are all consistent with her being Wendy's mother, a conclusion hinted at but not confirmed until the fourth book, Peter and the Sword of Mercy. It is implied throughout the books that she has romantic feelings for Peter, which is confirmed in Peter and the Secret of Rundoon where they share a kiss before parting ways. Because Peter wishes to stay on Mollusk Island (also known as Neverland) to stay young, she marries George Darling, a childhood friend for whom she also formed romantic feelings. She is called "Molly" rather than "Mary", but "Molly" is a traditional nickname for "Mary".

Tribes
Mollusk Tribe: a tribe of Native Americans.
Fighting Prawn: Chief of The Mollusk Tribe that live on Peter's Island and father of the adventurous Shining Pearl. 
Scorpion Tribe: a dangerous group in Peter and the Secret of Rundoon, who use poison as their main weapon and are the most feared tribe of them all.

Other characters
Lord Ombra: a shadow creature from Peter and the Shadow Thieves and Peter and the Secret of Rundoon
Captain Nerezza: a cruel captain lacking a nose who is often employed by the "Others".
King Zarboff III – the King of Rundoon and one of the "Others".
Mr. Grempkin: second in Command at St. Norbert's Home For Wayward Boys. 
The Headmaster's Daughter: an awful girl who likes to drop spiders on the boy's heads.
Prentiss: a new boy at St. Norbert's.
James: a boy closer to Peter than any other at St. Norbert's. In Sword of Mercy, he becomes James Smith and works for Scotland Yard.
Tubby Ted: a boy who is always hungry.
Thomas: a boy from St. Norbert's.
William Slank: an evil man who was second in command on the ship known as "The Never Land". He is presumed dead after Peter and the Shadow Thieves.
Little Richard: a huge giant of a man who is very handy with a whip. He is eaten alive by Slank so that he could live.
Mr. Grin: the crocodile.
 Alf: an elderly sailor aboard the Never Land who befriends the Lost Boys.
 Magill: a Starcatcher who can talk to bears and wolves and is a loyal ally of the Aster's.
 Hurky: a pirate who serves as Smee's second-in-command during Hook's absence in Secret of Rundoon. In the tie-in novel Cave of the Dark Wind, he mentions that he grew up on a dairy farm. 
 Boggs: pirate scout who can only count as high as thirty-nine.
 Preston and Harbuckle: two overweight pirates who Hook sets adrift to lighten his ship. Harbuckle is quite intelligent, while Preston is fairly dimwitted and went to sea to get away from an unhappy marriage.
 Bakari: a Starcatchers operating in the Middle East who had a run in with Lord Ombra prior to Shadow Thieves and assists the main characters in their adventures in Rundoon in Secret of Rundoon.
 Crenshaw: a pirate scout featured in the first two books.
 Eagle-Eye Davis: a pirate lookout who can spot a lizard scratching from over half-a-mile away.
 McGuinn: a senior Starcatcher and family friend of the Asters.
 Storey: Black Stache's crew chief in the first book.
 Captain Scott: the resourceful captain of the Wasp, a ship targeted by pirates in the first book because it is transporting Leonard Aster.
 George Darling: an upper-class boy with a crush on Molly, who he eventually marries.
 The Skeleton: a mysterious minion of Lord Ombra who can inflict pain with a touch.
 Cheeky O'Neal: a spy posing as a castaway who helps Nezerra attack Mollusk Island in Sword of Mercy.
 Crankins:: a pirate who leads a short-lived mutiny against Hook in Sword of Mercy.

Peter Pan in Scarlet

Fireflyer: a silly blue fairy born out of a baby's first laugh. Like most fairies he's conceited and self-centered, but he's a devoted friend to the lost boy Slightly.
Ravello: a mysterious circus owner who is revealed to be Captain Hook.

Peter Pan and the Pirates

Hard-to-Hit: the prince of the tribe of Native Americans living on the island of Neverland, Great Big Little Panther's son and Tiger Lily's younger brother. He was voiced by Aaron Lohr. 
Girl in the Moon: a girl who is responsible for bringing the night by replacing the sun that appears during the day with the moon at the normal time.
King Kyros: the Ice King of Neverland who owns a giant ice cave and has elves as his subworkers. Peter entered into conflict with the king when he entered the king's home without permission and took away a crystal claiming it as his own.
Crooked Tail: a mermaid who was once beautiful, but conceited and haughty until a potion meant to enhance her beauty went horribly awry and turned her into a green-skinned hag. She helped Peter Pan rescue Wendy from two mermaids who tried to turn Wendy into a mermaid.
Short Tom: Captain Hook's mischievous one-eyed pet parrot; is capable of speech, though extremely limited. He constantly tries to warn the pirates when Peter Pan steals aboard, but usually fails.
Captain Patch: Captain Hook's late brother (whose real name is Jasper Hook), who also had been a pirate; so-called because Hook once took out his eye in a sword fight long ago. Appears as a vengeful ghost in two episodes. He was voiced by Ed Gilbert who also voiced Smee.
Olook: a grumpy giant troll.

Peter Pan: The Animated Series

Sinistra: the evil Queen of Darkness, the main antagonist. She is a witch who attempts to destroy Neverland. 
Luna: Sinistra's granddaughter and a powerful Princess of Light, with a dark and powerful alter ego. She is destined to become Sinistra's successor, but does not want to destroy Neverland. She befriends Peter Pan, Wendy and her brother, and the Lost Boys.
Rascal: a raccoon who often visits Peter Pan's house and spends a lot of time in Michael's company.
Penelope: an infant flower fairy who is unable to fly after her mother died. The other fairies have to leave her behind because otherwise they will all die. Peter and Wendy have to teach her how to fly.
Don Malaprop: a brave knight who rides a wooden horse.
Memory Bird: a wise bird who knows almost everything about Neverland.

Neverland miniseries

Aaya: is Tiger Lily.
Kaw Tribe: the Native American tribe.
Captain Elizabeth Bonny: the previous captain of the pirate ship.
Fox: a lost boy that was killed by Captain Bonny
The Twins: instead of two twins in the Lost Boys, there is one boy known as Twins for unknown reasons.

The New Adventures of Peter Pan

The Darling children - three siblings who live in 21st century London. They are descended from the original Wendy Darling.

Wendy III - the oldest of the siblings and the closest to Peter. She is the most mature among all the children and often takes on the role of mother.
John - the middle child and the oldest son. He is very well read and always has the Great Book of Neverland with him, which he regularly consults when faced with problems in Neverland.
Michael - the youngest in the family, who is often inattentive and naive and usually acts rashly, which can have dire consequences for everyone.

Lost Kids - six children who do not know life in the real world and live with their leader Peter Pan in Neverland, because they, like him, have decided never to grow up. They are each very different and unique, and unlike most adaptations include girls.

Chubs - a medium-sized fat boy who is skilled at cooking and loves to eat.
 Cynthia - a tall blonde girl with bright blue eyes. She is talented and inventive, and often deals a lot with construction and the processing of various mixtures.
Meera - a friendly and calm girl of Indian origin.
Stringbean - a tall and nerdy boy. He is the most well-read of them all and has the largest vocabulary, which sometimes rivals John.
Maya - a very sporty and agile girl who uses her acrobatic tricks for fun as well as for fighting with pirates. She has tanned skin and red curly hair.
Baby - a little blond boy with big blue eyes. He is the youngest in the group and is thus close to Michael. He is very good with a slingshot, his best weapon.

The Pirates - a gang of six pirates who live on the Jolly Roger with their captain, Hook. They often become discontent with their captain's obsession with Peter Pan, though most times he manages to win their favour with rumours of gold and treasure. They all come from different backgrounds and cultures.

Jack Sorrow - a medium-sized, slender pirate, with black hair and a pink suit. He is very conceited and claims to be the most talented at everything. He uses his sword as a weapon for fighting.
Asbjoern - a tall man of Nordic descent. He is a sturdy build, has blonde hair and often wears a large Viking helmet . He uses a large hammer as a weapon for fighting.
Dagan - a young pirate of medium height. Despite his great fondness for food, he looks quite thin, wears a large hat and an eye patch. His intellect and reasoning are on a very low level, so it is not difficult to outsmart him and ask him to do something. He is also very childish and playful.
Shaloon - a great pirate of mature age, with tanned skin. His greatest strength is muscle strength. However, he is very scared and is mostly afraid of his own shadow, which exceeds all of his strengths.

Other characters
Cleo, Chloe and Zoe - three mermaids who live in Mermaid Lagoon. They don't make friends with anyone else and spend their time alone. The water in which they live is enchanted and would turn any who touch it evil. They care deeply about their home but have a great desire to rule all of Neverland.
Loki - is a demon who takes the form of a small boy. He was locked away in a special box in a cave on Neverland when Captain Hook found it. Hook thinking it a treasure chest, he opens it and releases Loki. Peter Pan, along with the Darling siblings, the Lost Kids and with the help of the Indian tribe, managed to defeat him and lock him back into his box.
The Sylphies - a group of lively flowers that have large heads and collars in the shape of a blossom and give off pollen, who live in a secret garden in Neverland. They talk incessantly to whoever would listen to them and shower them with questions, which is why most of Neverland avoids them.
Swamp Monster - a large female creature that resembles a snake and a lizard and lives in the haunted swamp.
The Chumbas - a group of warlike creatures that live in a golden temple. Their greatest treasure is a thick purple egg which allows anyone who holds it to control the Chumbas.
Captain Muscles - a fictional character from a movie in the real world.
Synapse - the villain from same movie as Captain Muscles. He was a fictional character, but due to a technical error combined with the magic of Neverland, he escaped the movie and entered Neverland.
Armus - a former friend of Peter who was once a Lost Kid, but turned against him when he mistakenly thought Peter abandoned him. He has weak eyes that cannot stand the daylight.
Sienna - a very agile girl who only appears in the second season. She was once a Lost Kid, but she left and has been a loner ever since. She is a skilled thief and is interested in various valuable or magical objects, as well as Smee's food which she often steals.

The Flower Ladies 
These four human-sized fairies are the guardians of nature in Neverland. They are also the forgotten godmothers of Tinker Bell. They each represent a season and together maintain the balance of nature's life cycle.
Poppy - summer fairy, has black hair and wears a red dress.
Iris - fairy of autumn, has light brown hair and wears an orange dress.
Petunia - fairy of winter, has pale skin, blonde hair and wears a blue-white dress.
Daisy - spring fairy, has curly brown hair and wears a light green dress.

References

External links
 

 
Peter Pan